Aisin Gioro Yunki (5 January 1680 – 10 July 1732), born Yinqi and formally known as Prince Heng of the First Rank, was an imperial prince of the Manchu ruled Qing Dynasty. He was the fifth son of Kangxi Emperor who survived to adulthood.

Life 
Yinqi was born on 5 January 1680 to Lady Gorolo, Concubine Yi (宜嬪). Yinqi was raised since his childhood by his grandmother, Empress Xiaohuizhang, and did not participate in the battle for the imperial throne.

In the  35th year of Kangxi, Emperor Kangxi ordered Yinqi to lead the Plain Yellow Banners troops against Dzungar Khanate ruled by Galdan Boshugtu Khan.The battle ended with Qing Victory.

In may of the 48th year of Kangxi, Yinqi was granted the title of Prince Heng  of the First Rank (恒親王). In 1719, he designed his eldest son, Hongsheng, as his heir. Hongsheng was stripped of his titles in 1727 because of his inability to deal with official affairs.

He changed his name to Yunqi when Yinzhen became emperor.

Yunki died on 10 July 1732 and was posthumously awarded with the title of Prince Hengwen of the First Rank (恒温亲王).The princedom of Yunki was inherited by his second son, Hongzhi.

Prince Heng's Mansion is located near the Shichahai neighborhood in central Beijing. In present the residence in known as Prince Chun Mansion.

Family 
Primary Consort

 First Primary Consort, of the Tatara clan (嫡福晉 他塔喇氏)
 Second Primary Consort, of the Fuca clan (嫡福晉 富察氏)

Secondary Consort

 Secondary Consort, of the Liugiya clan (側福晉 劉佳氏)
 Hongsheng (恭恪貝勒 弘昇; 6 May 1696 – 13 May 1754), Prince Gongke of the Third Rank, first son
 Princess of the Third Rank (27 October 1698 – 11 November 1759), first daughter
 Married Namusai (纳穆塞) of the Khalkha Ulangagimot clan (喀尔喀 乌梁海济勒默氏)

 Secondary Consort, of the Gūwalgiya clan ( 側福晉瓜爾佳氏)
 Hongzhi (恆恪親王 弘晊; 26 August 1700 – 3 July 1775) Prince Hengke of the First Rank, second son
 Third son (7 October 1702 – 29 August  1707)
 Hong'ang (鎭国将军 弘昂; 25 April 1705 – 26 January 1782), Hereditary General of the First Rank, fourth son
 Fifth son (10 July 1707 – 15 July 1707)
 Fifth daughter (23 October 1708 – April/May 1710)

Concubine

 Mistress, of the Magiya clan (庶妃 馬佳氏)
 Princess of the Third Rank (10 November 1699 – 7 April 1743), second daughter
 Married Tserengwangbu (策凌旺布) Oirat Chuoluosi clan (绰罗斯氏) in 1719
 Lady of the Second Rank (12 January 1703 – 13 July 1724), third daughter
 Married Dachong'a (达冲阿) of the Sakda clan in 1721
 Lady of the Second Rank (23 December 1705 – 23 June 1784), fourth daughter
 Married Junxibandi (郡錫班第) of the Khorchin Borjigin in 1735

 Mistress, of the Bai clan (庶妃 白氏)
 Mistress, of the Qian clan (庶妃 錢氏)
 Hongxu (奉恩将军 弘昫; 8 November 1710 – 13 September 1753), Hereditary General of the Fourth Rank, sixth son
 Hongtong (奉恩将军 弘曈; 3 November 1711 – 22 March 1754), Hereditary General of the Fourth Rank, seventh son

 Mistress, of the Zhang clan (庶妃 張氏)
 Sixth Daughter (16 September 1711 – 17 November 1744)
 Married Sumadi (蘇馬第) of the Dun'erluosi Borjigin (敦尔罗斯博尔济吉特氏) in 1738

Ancestry

See also 

 Royal and noble ranks of the Qing dynasty
 Ranks of imperial consorts in China#Qing

References 

Qing dynasty imperial princes
Kangxi Emperor's sons
1680 births
1732 deaths
Prince Heng